Max Harrison Sanders (born 4 January 1999) is an English professional footballer who plays as a midfielder for Lincoln City.

Club career

Brighton & Hove Albion

Sanders was first named in a matchday squad for Brighton & Hove Albion on 17 March 2018; he remained an unused substitute in a 2–0 defeat to Manchester United in the FA Cup sixth round.

Wimbledon (loan)

Sanders joined AFC Wimbledon on loan from Brighton on 2 September 2019.
He subsequently made his professional debut for AFC Wimbledon on 7 September 2019, replacing Scott Wagstaff in the 45th minute of a 1–2 defeat to Milton Keynes Dons. Sanders' sole goal during his loan spell at Wimbledon came on 15 February 2020, in a 2–2 draw to Rotherham United in League One.

2020–21
On 1 July 2020, Sanders signed a new one-year contract with Brighton which extended his stay at the club until the end of the 2020–21 season. He made his debut for The Seagulls coming on as a sub in a 4–0 victory over Portsmouth in the EFL Cup on 17 September 2020. 6 days later he started in The Seagulls 2–0 away win over Preston, this appearance also coming in the EFL Cup. He made his third and final League Cup appearance of the season as an 81st-minute substitute for Jayson Molumby which The Seagulls lost 3–0 at home to Manchester United on 30 September falling short of the quarter finals.

Lincoln City

On 1 February 2021, Sanders signed for Lincoln City for an undisclosed fee, with a deal running until 2023. He made his debut on 17 February, starting in the EFL Trophy semi-final away at Sunderland, being replaced in the 58th minute in an eventual penalty shootout loss after a 1–1 draw. He made his league debut for The Imps three days later, coming on as a substitute in the 72nd minute, one minute before Lincoln's winning goal in a 2–1 away victory over Wigan.

He scored his first goal for the side on 6 November 2021, scoring the only goal of the FA Cup first round fixture at home against Bowers & Pitsea.

Career statistics

References

External links

1999 births
Living people
People from Horsham
English footballers
England youth international footballers
Association football midfielders
Brighton & Hove Albion F.C. players
AFC Wimbledon players
English Football League players
Lincoln City F.C. players